The  was one of the most powerful samurai families in Japan in the Sengoku period and held domains primarily in the Kantō region. Their last name was simply Hōjō (北条) but in order to differentiate between the earlier Hōjō clan with the same name and mon were called "Later Hōjō", although this was not the official family name.

History
The history of the family is written in the Hōjō Godaiki.

The clan is traditionally reckoned to be started by Ise Shinkurō, who came from a branch of the prestigious Ise clan, descendants of Taira no Toshitsugu, a family in the direct service of the Ashikaga shoguns, as close advisors and Shugo (Governor) of Yamashiro Province (Ise Sadamichi since 1493).

During the Imagawa clan succession crisis in 1476, Shinkurō whose sister was married to Imagawa Yoshitada, Shugo (Governor) of Suruga Province, became associated with the Imagawa clan. At the death of Yoshitada in battle, Shinkurō went down to Suruga Province to support his nephew Imagawa Ujichika. Through this relationship Shinkurō quickly established a base of power in Kantō.

His son wanted his lineage to have a more illustrious name, and chose Hōjō, after the line of regents of the Kamakura shogunate, to which his wife also belonged. So he became Hōjō Ujitsuna, and his father, Ise Shinkurō, was posthumously renamed Hōjō Sōun.

The Late Hōjō, sometimes known as the Odawara Hōjō after their home castle of Odawara in Sagami Province, were not related to the earlier Hōjō clan. Their power rivaled that of the Tokugawa clan, but eventually Toyotomi Hideyoshi eradicated the power of the Hōjō in the siege of Odawara (1590), banishing Hōjō Ujinao and his wife Toku Hime (a daughter of Tokugawa Ieyasu) to Mount Kōya, where Ujinao died in 1591.

The tea master Yamanoue Sōji, a disciple of Sen no Rikyū, was under the patronage of the Odawara lords. Following their fall, he was brutally executed on orders by Toyotomi Hideyoshi.

The clan ruled Sayama Domain in Kawachi Province through the Edo period.

Heads
The heads of the Late Hōjō clan were:
Hōjō Sōun (1432–1519)
Hōjō Ujitsuna (1487–1541), son of Sōun
Hōjō Ujiyasu (1515–1571), son of Ujitsuna
Hōjō Ujimasa (1538–1590), son of Ujiyasu
Hōjō Ujinao (1562–1591), son of Ujimasa

Prominent vassals

 Hōjō Genan
 Hōjō Ujikuni
 Hōjō Ujinori
 Hōjō Ujiteru
 Hōjō Ujitada
 Hōjō Tsunataka
 Hōjō Tsunashige
 Hōjō Ujishige
 Tame Mototada
 Matsuda Norihide
 Daidōji Morimasa
 Daidōji Masashige
 Tōyama Kagetsuna
 Shimizu Yasuhide
 Tominaga Naokatsu
 Fūma Kotarō
 Naitō Tsunahide
 Ōta  Ujisuke
 Narita Nagayasu
 Tōyama Tsunakage
 Chiba Naotane
 Chiba Tanetomi

Later Hōjō clan’s prominent castles
Castles and retainers

Sagami Province
Odawara Castle : Home castle of Later Hōjō clan, Hōjō Ujiyasu
Tamanawa Castle : Hōjō Ujitoki, Hōjō Tsunashige
Misaki Castle : Hōjō Ujinori
Ashigara Castle : Hōjō Ujimitsu
Tsukui Castle : Naito clan
Kawamura Castle

Izu Province
Nirayama Castle ; Hōjō Sōun
Yamanaka Castle : Matsuda clan
Nagahama Castle : (Hōjō navy’s castle)
Shimoda Castle ; (Hōjō navy’s castle) Kasahara Yasukatsu, Shimizu Yasuhide
Kōkokuji Castle
Fukasawa Castle
Maruyama Castle

Musashi Province
Edo Castle : Tominaga Naokatsu, Hōjō Tsunataka
Setagaya Castle
Kozukue Castle : Kasahara clan
Takiyama Castle : Hojo Ujiteru
Hachigata Castle : Hōjō Ujikuni
Hachiōji Castle : Hōjō Ujiteru
Kurihashi Castle : Hōjō Ujiteru
Iwatsuki Castle
Taki-no Castle
Aoki Castle : Tame Mototada
Oshi Castle : Narita clan
Kasai Castle : Tōyama Kagetsuna
Kawagoe Castle : Hōjō Tsunashige
Matsuyama Castle

Other Province
Matsuida Castle : Daidōji Masashige
Moto Sakura Castle : Chiba clan
Karasawa Castle : Sano clan
Maebashi Castle : Kitajō Takahiro
Numata castle
Hirai Castle : Tame Mototada
Usui Castle
Oyama Castle
Sekiyado Castle
Koga Castle

In popular culture
Hyouge Mono (へうげもの Hepburn: Hyōge Mono, lit. "Jocular Fellow") is a Japanese manga written and illustrated by Yoshihiro Yamada. It was adapted into an anime series in 2011, and includes a fictional depiction of the Hōjō.

The Hōjō are a playable faction in the video game Shogun 2.

The later Hōjō clan of the Sengoku jidai from the manga and anime of Inuyasha, and the second movie Inuyasha the Movie: The Castle Beyond the Looking Glass.

In the 2021 manga series The Elusive Samurai the main character is one of the last Hojo survivors of his region.

See also
Hōjō Akinokami
Lady Hayakawa
Ashikaga Ujinohime

References

Further reading
Turnbull, Stephen (2002). War in Japan: 1467–1615. Oxford: Osprey Publishing.

 
Japanese clans
Taira clan